The Panic of 1819: Reactions and Policies is a 1962 book by the economist Murray Rothbard, in which the author discusses what he calls the first great economic crisis of the United States. The  book is based on his doctoral dissertation in economics at Columbia University during the mid-1950s.

Summary
During the 19th century some observers believed that the Panic originated within the economic system itself, since the event could not be readily attributed to any specific event, as had some previous crises. Rothbard, however, states that the Panic of 1819 arose from developments related to the War of 1812 and the postwar prosperity that followed. The outbreak of war stifled foreign trade and spurred the growth of domestic manufacturing, which grew to fill the demand previously met by imports. The government borrowed heavily to finance the war. Rothbard alleges that this led to a credit expansion which in turn led to rising prices.  Rothbard's book provides a narrative of these events.

Reception
The book had at least seven reviews which included both praise and criticism.

In a 1990 interview in The Austrian Economics Newsletter Rothbard was asked about the reception to the book and said it was well received, "In fact, much better than any other of my books. Maybe that's because I didn't analyze the causes. I only wrote about how people wanted to cure it."

Publishing history 
 Auburn, Alabama: Ludwig von Mises Institute, 2007. .
 Auburn, Alabama: Ludwig von Mises Institute, 2002. Web-based PDF file prepared by William Harshbarger.
 New York: AMS Press, 1973. .
 New York: Columbia University Press, 1962.

Notes

External links 
 1975 review by Mark Skousen
 Christopher Mayer’s review of the 2002 online edition
 Online edition in PDF format (click download icon on top menu bar)

1962 non-fiction books
American non-fiction books
Books about economic crises
Books by Murray Rothbard
Columbia University Press books
Economic history of the United States
English-language books
Financial crises
History of banking in the United States